The 2022 Loyola Ramblers men's volleyball team represents Loyola University Chicago in the 2022 NCAA Division I & II men's volleyball season. The Ramblers, led by 7th year head coach Mark Hulse, play their home games at Joseph J. Gentile Arena. The Cardinals are members of the Midwestern Intercollegiate Volleyball Association and were picked to win the conference title in the MIVA in the preseason poll.

Roster

Schedule

 *-Indicates conference match.
 Times listed are Central Time Zone.

Broadcasters
Hawai'i: Kanoa Leahey & Ryan Tsuki
Hawai'i: Kanoa Leahey & James Anastassiades
St. Francis: Sam Levitt & Ray Gooden
NJIT: Scott Sudikoff & Ray Gooden
Belmont Abbey: Tyler Aki & Lauren Withrow
Long Beach State: Tyler Aki & Kris Berzins
Lincoln Memorial: Adam Haley
King: Brittney Ramsey & Julie Ward
Grand Canyon: Ray Gooden & Kris Berzins
Quincy: Sam Levitt & Ray Gooden
Lindenwood: Sam Levitt & Kris Berzins
Ohio State: Keith Kokinda & Hanna Williford
Ball State: No commentary
McKendree: Colin Suhre
Lewis: Scott Sudikoff & Lauren Withrow
Purdue Fort Wayne: Scott Sudikoff & Ray Gooden
Emmanuel: Ray Gooden & Kris Berzins
Daemen: Scott Sudikoff & Ray Gooden
Purdue Fort Wayne: Mike Maahs
McKendree: Scott Sudikoff & Ray Gooden
Lewis: Patrick Hennessey & Tyler Avenatti
Lindenwood: Michael Wagenknecht & Sara Wagenknecht
Quincy: No commentary
Ball State: Scott Sudikoff & Kris Berzins
Ohio State: Scott Sudikoff & Kris Berzins
MIVA Quarterfinal- Lindenwood: Ray Gooden
MIVA Semifinal- Purdue Fort Wayne: Scott Sudikoff & Ray Gooden

Rankings 

^The Media did not release a Pre-season or Post Conference Tournament poll.

Honors
To be filled in upon completion of the season.

References

2022 in sports in Illinois
2022 NCAA Division I & II men's volleyball season
2022 team
Loyola Chicago